FUB-144 (also known as FUB-UR-144) is an indole-based synthetic cannabinoid that is presumed to be a potent agonist of the CB1 receptor and has been sold online as a designer drug. It is an analogue of UR-144 and XLR-11 where the pentyl chain has been replaced with fluorobenzyl.

Legal status 
In the United States, FUB-144 was temporarily emergency scheduled by the DEA in 2019. and made a permanent Schedule I Controlled Substance on April 7, 2022.

Sweden's public health agency suggested classifying FUB-144 as hazardous substance on March 24, 2015.

See also
 A-834,735
 AB-005
 FAB-144
 JWH-018
 STS-135

References

Cannabinoids
Designer drugs
Fluoroarenes
Indoles
Tetramethylcyclopropanoylindoles